Loos-en-Gohelle is a commune in the Pas-de-Calais department in the Hauts-de-France region of France.

Geography 

A former coal mining town, three miles northwest of the centre of Lens, at the junction of the D943 and the  A21 autoroute. Its nearest neighbours are Lens to the south, Grenay to the west, Hulluch to the northeast and Bénifontaine to the east. The two largest (184 m & 182 m) spoil heaps in Europe are found here.

History 

The place was first documented in 1071, as "Lohes". The name has changed considerably over the years: Lothae, Lo, Lohes, Loes, Loez and Loos. It was not until 1791 that the name of "Loos" was officially sanctioned. According to some, the name comes from the Germanic "Lôh" and Dutch "Loo" which mean "wood", but there is no archaeological evidence of what could have been a forest. According to others, the name derives from the Germanic "Laupo" which means marshy meadows, which, given the topography of the town, tends to support this theory. In 1937, after much confusion with Loos-lez-Lille (today Loos), it was decided to add the region's name (Gohelle) to that of the commune.

The oldest documents that specify the existence of Loos date from the eleventh century, at the time of construction of the abbey of Anchin. But with the foundation of a church dedicated to Saint Vaast, it suggests that the village existed long before (St. Vaast lived in the 6th century).  
By the Middle Ages, Loos-en-Gohelle was a  large village whose inhabitants lived mainly by farming: in 1569, 350 inhabitants, in 1759, 600 people ; In 1824, 700 inhabitants and in 1850 around 800 people.

It was around 1850 that the town started to become prosperous; farmers could fertilize previously uncultivated land, thanks to technology provided by Guislain Decrombecque and the discovery of coal resulted in a very rapid increase of population.
Many monuments and cemeteries reflect the destruction during World War I which completely destroyed the town, particularly during the Battle of Loos, from 25 September - 8 October 1915. A major battle was fought by the Canadian Expeditionary Force at Hill 70 between 15–25 August 1917, resulting in the capture of that landscape feature dominating nearby Lens. Six Victoria Crosses were awarded for valour during that battle; a war memorial was officially unveiled there on 8 April 2017. At the end of the war, not a single building or tree had survived the pounding of artillery. Reminders of the war persist with the periodic discovery of unexploded ordnance.

The mining infrastructure, industry and transport were hit again during World War II.

Coal was mined here by the Compagnie des mines de Béthune from 1855 until 1946, and by its nationalized successor until 1986. The very rural village changed into a town, with many foreign workers, especially from Poland, swelling the workforce. A former mining site (Écopole) has been preserved and now hosts many cultural, economic and environmental activities which are the symbol of new developments for the commune. Écopole 11/19 comprises buildings dating from 1923 and a modern concrete winding tower (height 66m) which operated from 1960 to 1986.

In recent years, Loos has experienced another kind of destruction: As the population left the mining towns seeking work elsewhere, about 1000 homes have been demolished in the recent past.

The landscape is still marked by enormous spoil heaps, those of pits 11 and 19, visible for miles around. They are part of the mines of the Nord-Pas de Calais region that have become the 38th French site on the list of UNESCO World Heritage Sites as "a living and changing landscape".

Several times in its history Loos came close to being removed from the map of France. Instead it has been reborn 5 times, and is still undergoing transformation. As of 2008, Loos-en-Gohelle was a town whose economy was dominated by light industry, textiles and workshops for artisans and professionals, but it also still retained a strong rural connection with thirty farms within the commune.

Population

Places of interest 

 The church of St. Vaast, rebuilt, as was the rest of the town, after the First World War.
 The war memorials.
 Écopôle 11/19
 The Commonwealth War Graves Commission cemeteries.

See also 
 Communes of the Pas-de-Calais department

References

External links 

  
 Website of the Communaupole de Lens-Liévin 
 The Battle of Loos website
 The CWGC British cemetery
 The CWGC Dud Corner British cemetery

Loosengohelle
Artois